Wake Up Little Susie is a 1988 Filipino comedy film directed by Luciano B. Carlos and starring the comedy trio of Tito Sotto, Vic Sotto and Joey de Leon alongside child actress Ice Seguerra as the titular character. The film also stars Lotlot de Leon, Ramon Christopher, Kristina Paner, Cris Villanueva, Manilyn Reynes and Janno Gibbs. Produced by Regal Films, it was released on April 27, 1988.

Critic Lav Diaz gave the film a mixed review, criticizing its unoriginality and the unnecessary addition of musical scenes involving love teams while commending the hilarity of Tito, Vic and Joey.

Plot
Inmates David, Napoleon and Alexander are in jail due to a frameup, but a scuffle during a morning exercise routine gives them the opportunity to escape. As they run from the authorities, they meet Susie Seguerra, a child who is also on the run from men who want to kidnap her. The trio then try to take care of Susie while they evade capture as fugitives.

Cast

Tito Sotto as David
Vic Sotto as Napoleon
Joey de Leon as Alexander
Ice Seguerra as Susie Seguerra
Lotlot de Leon as Luglug de Leon
Ramon Christopher as Mon Dragon
Kristina Paner as Tina Turbo
Cris Villanueva as Cris Cross
Manilyn Reynes as Maniquin
Janno Gibbs as Janno Bravo
Fred Montilla as Don Octavio
Janice Jurado as Noemi
Cynthia Patag as Lorraine
Rez Cortez as Hermogenes Macatayog
Minnie Aguilar as Patricia
Mely Tagasa as Roda
Lou Veloso as Atty. Perfecto Holmado
Jordan Castillo as Cassius
Khryss Adalia as director
Vangie Labalan as producer
Bert Mansueto as producer's PRO
Jimmy Tongco as Macatastas
Cesar Esteban as Bruno
Perry de Guzman as Ador
Ryan Redillas as Butchy Boy
Lucy Quinto as Aling Petra
Josie Galvez as Aling Ineng
Eva Ramos as Aling Puding
Ike Lozada as manager 1
Big Boy Gomez as a zumo wrestler
Chito Alcid as manager 2
Rusty Santos as Samaniego
Joaquin Fajardo as a zumo wrestler
Eric Agaton as Tato

Production
Ice Seguerra (then named Aiza) received his first film role in Wake Up Little Susie after winning the Little Miss Philippines competition in 1987.

Release
Wake Up Little Susie was released on April 27, 1988.

Regal Films made the film available for streaming on YouTube without charge on May 6, 2020.

Critical response
Lav Diaz, writing for the Manila Standard, gave the film a mixed review. He largely criticized the film for copying its story from the then-to-be-released American film Three Men and a Baby, stating that "this is a very big insult to us because Pinoys already have the ability to make something original." Diaz also disparaged the scenes of singing and dancing given to the film's love teams (de Leon-Christopher, Paner-Villanueva and Reynes-Gibbs), which he found unnecessary and inserted only "to make their fans scream." He admitted, however, that Jose Javier Reyes's script and the comedic performances of Tito Sotto, Vic Sotto and Joey de Leon managed to recover the film from its faults.

References

External links

1988 films
1988 comedy films
Filipino-language films
Philippine comedy films